In Norse mythology, Glaðsheimr (Old Norse "bright home") is a realm in Asgard where Odin's hall of Valhalla is located according to Grímnismál.

Snorri states in Gylfaginning that Glaðsheimr is a meeting hall containing thirteen high seats where the male Æsir hold council, located in Iðavöllr in Asgard, near the hall of Vingólf where the Ásynjur goddesses gathered.

Notes

References
Orchard, Andy (1997). Dictionary of Norse Myth and Legend. Cassell. 

Locations in Norse mythology
Odin